Bill Peters (26 March 1898 – 6 December 1957) was an  Australian rules footballer who played with South Melbourne in the Victorian Football League (VFL).

Notes

External links 

1898 births
1957 deaths
Australian rules footballers from Victoria (Australia)
Sydney Swans players